Ranipur Riyasat railway station is located in Ranipur town, Khairpur District of Sindh province, Pakistan.

See also
 List of railway stations in Pakistan
 Pakistan Railways

References

External links

Railway stations in Khairpur District
Railway stations on Karachi–Peshawar Line (ML 1)